Leptodactylus cunicularius is a species of frogs in the family Leptodactylidae.

It is endemic to Brazil.
Its natural habitats are moist savanna, subtropical or tropical moist shrubland, subtropical or tropical seasonally wet or flooded lowland grassland, rivers, swamps, intermittent freshwater marshes, and pastureland.
It is threatened by habitat loss.

References

cunicularius
Endemic fauna of Brazil
Amphibians described in 1978
Taxonomy articles created by Polbot